Leucotina casta is a species of gastropods belonging to the family Amathinidae.

The species is found in Australia and Japan.

References

Amathinidae